Acupalpus guttiger is an insect-eating ground beetle of the Acupalpus genus. These Beetles can be found in East Palaearctic.

guttiger
Beetles described in 1938